Blueberry Garden is a puzzle-platform game. It was developed by Erik Svedäng and released on June 10, 2009 for Microsoft Windows, and on January 24, 2014 for Mac OS X and Linux via Steam. It has a piano soundtrack written by Daduk. It is the winner of Seumas McNally Grand Prize for "Best Independent Game" at the 2009 Independent Games Festival. The game's soundtrack partially inspired that of Minecraft, composed by C418.

Gameplay

Development
When developer Erik Svedang was asked in an interview about the art creation for the game, he replied "The coloring is in Photoshop actually. But the lines are markers on paper."

Reception

The game received "average" reviews according to the review aggregation website Metacritic.

References

External links
Official site
Blueberry Garden review at IndieGames.com
GDC 2009 Blueberry Garden Hands-On
 Blueberry Garden Spotlight from GameAwards.se
 

2009 video games
Linux games
MacOS games
Puzzle-platform games
Seumas McNally Grand Prize winners
Video games developed in Sweden
Windows games
Single-player video games